Ceratempis is a genus of flies in the family Empididae. There is one described species in Ceratempis, C. longicornis.

References

Empidoidea genera
Articles created by Qbugbot
Empididae